Gyem is a Kainji language of Bauchi State, Nigeria.

References

Sources 
Blench, Roger. Gyem: an endangered east Kainji language of Northern Nigeria.

East Kainji languages
Languages of Nigeria